Georg Bohm is a retired Vice President of Research and Technology for Bridgestone Americas noted for the development of electron beam pre-curing of elastomers.

Education
 BS Electrical Engineering, University of Vienna  
 1962 – Ph.D. Physics from University of Vienna in Austria

Between 1963 and 1967, he held scientific/academic positions at: the Max Planck Institute for Physical Chemistry in Gottingen, Germany, Seoul National University in Korea, the University of Bandung in Indonesia, and Northwestern University in Illinois.

Career

 1967 – Radiation Research Laboratories of Firestone Corp. in Westbury, New York
 2005 – retired from Bridgestone Americas as VP Research and Technology
 2010 – President of Appia LLC

Awards
 2016 – Charles Goodyear Medal of the Rubber Division of the American Chemical Society

References

Living people

Year of birth missing (living people)
Polymer scientists and engineers
Tire industry people
Bridgestone people